Herndliconus is an extinct genus of sea snails, marine gastropod mollusks in the family Conidae.

Species

References

Conidae